General elections were held in Bermuda on 4 February 1983. The result was a victory for the United Bermuda Party, which won 26 of the 40 seats.

Electoral system
The 40 members of the House of Assembly were elected in 20 two-member constituencies. Voters had two votes, with the two candidates with the highest vote number being elected.

Results
Of the 29,958 registered voters, 24,163 cast valid votes. In 18 constituencies both elected members were from the same party, whilst two constituencies elected one member of the United Bermuda Party and one from the Progressive Labour Party.

References

Bermuda
1983 in Bermuda
Elections in Bermuda
Bermuda
February 1983 events in North America
Election and referendum articles with incomplete results